Henry Fulford may refer to:

 Henry English Fulford (1859–1929), British diplomat
 Henry Charles Fulford, British Liberal Party politician